The History of Cinema Museum (formerly the Dubai Moving Image Museum) is a museum in Dubai, United Arab Emirates.

The museum has a permanent exhibition focusing on prehistory of cinema. It was inaugurated by Sheikh Majid bin Mohammed bin Rashid Al Maktoum, Chairman of Dubai Culture and Arts Authority, on January 14, 2014. The museum showcases Akram Miknas's collection, on collaboration with Pierre Patau. The History of Cinema Museum covers the development and the evolution of visual entertainment through a collection of more than 300 antique items such as early animation devices (praxinoscope, zoetrope, mutoscope, etc.).

Gallery

References

External links
 Museum website

2014 establishments in the United Arab Emirates
Museums established in 2014
Museums in Dubai
Cinema museums